Abner Santiago Umba López (born 20 November 2002) is a Colombian cyclist, who currently rides for UCI Continental team .

Major results
2019
 1st Stages 3 & 5 Vuelta a Colombia Juniors
2021
 3rd Overall Tour de Savoie Mont-Blanc
1st  Young rider classification
1st Stage 1
 4th Overall Vuelta al Táchira
1st  Young rider classification
 4th Overall Tour Alsace
1st Stage 3

References

External links

2002 births
Living people
Colombian male cyclists
Sportspeople from Boyacá Department
21st-century Colombian people